Competitive men's professional soccer has been played in the United States since 1912 and since 2001 for women's.  Numerous leagues have existed over the years with some recognized by the United States Soccer Federation and some not.  The lists below are the single game attendance records for men's outdoor (60,000+), men's indoor (18,000+), and women's outdoor (18,000+) matches in American club soccer.

Men's soccer

MLS attendance

This list includes matches in which at least one Major League Soccer team has participated. This list does not include several matches played in the U.S. between two clubs not based in the United States (e.g. Chelsea vs. A.C. Milan in the 2009 World Football Challenge).

International doubleheaders
The following are MLS league matches that were part of a double-header involving international teams.

NASL attendance  
This list includes matches in which at least one team from the North American Soccer League (1968–84) has participated. 
 *Cosmos dropped "New York" from name in 1977 and 1978 seasons

Indoor soccer 
This list refers to indoor soccer matches, not to regulation soccer matches played in indoor stadiums.
Nearly all of the most attended indoor matches occurred during the 1980s in the Major Indoor Soccer League. The majority of these were hosted by the St. Louis Steamers during the early 1980s, or by the Cleveland Force during the mid 1980s.

Women's soccer

WUSA, WPS, NWSL attendance
These lists include the top-attended league matches from WUSA (2001–2003), WPS (2009–2011), and NWSL (2013–present), split into standalone matches and matches that were doubleheaders with MLS teams.

Standalone matches
The Washington Freedom of WUSA hold the overall attendance record. Portland Thorns FC held the top six NWSL attendance records until the debut home game of the Orlando Pride in 2016, which set the new NWSL record; that record was eclipsed by the Thorns in 2019 and still later by San Diego Wave FC in its debut at the new Snapdragon Stadium in 2022. The Thorns consistently draw over 14,000 fans and averaged slightly over 20,000 in the 2019 season, the last before COVID-19 effects; until that season they were the only NWSL team to have drawn over 10,000 fans more than thrice – continued strong numbers from Utah Royals FC and a club-record post-World Cup standalone match from the Chicago Red Stars pushed both clubs to their fourth 10,000-plus attendances.

The 2022 NWSL season, the first season since 2019 that was (relatively) unaffected by COVID-19, not only saw a new league single-game attendance record, but was also marked by very strong attendance for the debuting Angel City FC, which sold out its stadium four times in its first regular season and drew over 18,000 for two other home matches. Angel City was also Wave FC's opponent for the latter side's record-setting game.

MLS doubleheaders
Doubleheaders make up the majority of attendance records above 12,000 fans when discounting the Portland Thorns and Angel City FC.

WUSA attendances:

WUSA doubleheader listing:

Foreign clubs attendance
The following table shows record attendances for club soccer matches played in the U.S. where neither team was from a U.S. based league.

See also

 Major League Soccer attendance
 National Women's Soccer League attendance
 Soccer in the United States
 List of soccer clubs in the United States
 List of soccer stadiums in the United States

References

United States
Soccer records and statistics in the United States
American soccer clubs records and statistics